Richard Aitson (December 26, 1953- June 24, 2022) is a Kiowa-Kiowa Apache bead artist, curator, and poet from Oklahoma.

Background
Richard Aitson was born on December 26, 1953, in Anadarko, Oklahoma. His mother was the Kiowa traditionalist Alecia Keahbone Gonzales (1926–2011), who taught the Kiowa language at the University of Science and Arts of Oklahoma. Aitson's Kiowa name means "Buffalo Rider." His family has had many artistic accomplishments and he comes five generations of respected beadworkers. Aitson attended the Kimball Union Academy in Meriden, New Hampshire; Oberlin College in Oberlin, Ohio; and the Institute of American Indian Arts in Santa Fe, New Mexico.

In 1976, Aitson produced documentaries for the Bicentennial Commission about Native American events. He worked at the Squash Blossom Gallery in Aspen, Colorado, in 1979, which is where he first curated art shows. He has since curated many group shows, including "Winter Camp 2000" at the National Cowboy and Western Heritage Museum in Oklahoma City. He taught Native American literature at Anadarko High School and also taught at Bacone College as an Adjunct Professor of Art.

Beadwork
Aitson jumped into beadworking out of necessity. He was invited to join the prestigious Kiowa Gourd Clan and had to learn beading to create his gourd dance regalia. Aitson describes his art as "contemporary-traditional" and he creates beaded dance regalia for the Native American community as well as bead art for fine art collectors and museums.

He is known in particular for his fully beaded, functional cradleboards, but he also makes miniature cradleboards with extremely minute beads. "I am touched by the art of the World War years and the Reservation Era because in my opinion, that is when the finest Kiowa beadwork was produced," he writes. "Quality beads and supplies were extremely scarce, yet remarkable and ingenious beadwork that bridged the ancient and the future was quietly created."

Writing
Aitson writes poems inspired by traditional Kiowa oral history. His work, as Alan Velie writes, "combines the dream vision with animism to produce striking powerful imagery. He is inspired by Chilean poet Pablo Neruda.

Exhibits and honors
In 1992, Aitson had a solo exhibition at the US Department of Interior's Southern Plains Indian Museum in Anadarko. His work has earned numerous awards, including the Red Earth Festival's Grand Award in 1997 and the Southwest Museum's Jackie Autry Purchase Prize in 2005.  Many examples of his work are part of the permanent collection at the Sequoyah National Research Center in Little Rock, Arkansas.

See also
List of Native American artists
Visual arts by indigenous peoples of the Americas

Notes

References
Goins, Charles Robert and Danney Goble. Historical Atlas of Oklahoma. Norman: University of Oklahoma Press, 2006. .
Harjo, Barbara and Julie Pearson Little Thunder. Artistic Tastes: Favorite Recipes of Native American Artists. Santa Fe: Kiva Publishing, 1998. .
Johnson, Nancy and Norman F. Sheridan. Winter Camp 2000. Oklahoma City: National Cowboy and Western Heritage Museum, 1999. .
Velie, Alan R. American Indian Literature: An Anthology.  Norman: University of Oklahoma Press, 1999. .

External links
Oral History Interview with Richard Aitson

Apache people
Kiowa people
Native American bead artists
Native American painters
Native American writers
1953 births
Living people
Artists from Oklahoma
People from Anadarko, Oklahoma
Institute of American Indian Arts alumni
Bacone College faculty
Oberlin College alumni